Athos Tanzini (30 January 1913 – 28 September 2008) was an Italian fencer. He won a silver medal in the team sabre event at the 1936 Summer Olympics.

References

External links
 
 
 

1913 births
2008 deaths
Italian male fencers
Olympic fencers of Italy
Olympic silver medalists for Italy
Olympic medalists in fencing
Fencers at the 1936 Summer Olympics
Medalists at the 1936 Summer Olympics
Sportspeople from Livorno